Smederevo Stadium, known as Tvrđava, is a football stadium in Smederevo, Serbia. It is currently used mostly for football matches and is the home ground of FK Smederevo 1924. The stadium has a seating capacity for 17,200 spectators. The stadium was previously known as Sartid Stadium.

History
The stadium got its current appearance from its most recent reconstruction in 2000. The venue hosted a 2009 European Cup rugby league match, when Serbia played Wales.

In late August 2012, an unidentified virus infected the grass at the stadium and forced FK Smederevo to play its fixtures outside of the stadium until the grass was changed.

International matches
FR Yugoslavia national football team played here once.

See also
List of football stadiums in Serbia

References

Football venues in Serbia
Multi-purpose stadiums in Serbia
Rugby league stadiums in Serbia
FK Smederevo